Maryland House of Delegates District 29C is one of the 67 districts that compose the Maryland House of Delegates. Along with subdistricts 29A and 29B, it makes up the 29th district of the Maryland Senate. District 29C includes parts of Calvert County and St. Mary's County, and is represented by one delegate.

Demographic characteristics
As of the 2020 United States census, the district had a population of 45,970, of whom 34,881 (75.9%) were of voting age. The racial makeup of the district was 35,140 (76.4%) White, 4,929 (10.7%) African American, 155 (0.3%) Native American, 1,234 (2.7%) Asian, 55 (0.1%) Pacific Islander, 663 (1.4%) from some other race, and 3,835 (8.3%) from two or more races. Hispanic or Latino of any race were 2,247 (4.9%) of the population.

The district had 32,182 registered voters as of October 17, 2020, of whom 7,062 (21.9%) were registered as unaffiliated, 13,803 (42.9%) were registered as Republicans, 10,776 (33.5%) were registered as Democrats, and 264 (0.8%) were registered to other parties.

Past Election Results

1998

2002

2006

2010

2014

2018

In the November 6, 2018 election, Clark was challenged by Democrat Julia Nichols. She launched her campaign on September 1, 2017 and won the nomination  in the June 2018 Democratic primary. Nichols lost the election with 7,049 votes at 42.43% of the vote.

List of delegates

References

29C